Abu’l-Qāsem Khān Qarāgozlu, known by the title Nāṣer-al-molk, (July 13, 1856 – 26 December 1927) was an Iranian politician who served as Regent, Prime and Finance Minister of Iran during the Qajar dynasty.

Early life
Al-Molk studied at the Balliol College, Oxford, from 1879 to 1882. Among his classmates were Sir Edward Grey, later British Foreign Secretary, and Cecil Spring-Rice, later British Ambassador to Tehran and Washington.

Political career

Prime Minister
After returning to Iran, he became an interpreter for Naser al-Din Shah. Later he served as Finance Minister, then as Governor, and for a short time as Prime Minister during the period of the Constitutional Revolution of Iran in the reign of Mohammed Ali Shah Qajar in 1907. However, under pressure from some parliamentarians he resigned. Because he failed to ask Mohammed Ali Shah for his permission before resigning, the latter had him arrested. Al-Molk was released from prison only after an intervention by the British ambassador. Seeing his life threatened, he fled to England.

Regent
He did not return to Iran until after the fall of Mohammed Ali Shah in the summer of 1909 where he was installed as Regent for the infant Ahmad Shah Qajar and assumed the office of prime minister once again for a short time. He held the office of Regent until Ahmad Shah came of age in 1914. In a deep political character analysis of Al-Molk, the American treasurer-general of Persia William Morgan Shuster suggested that he showed a lack of strong leadership in his office.

Life in England
In 1915, Al-Molk left Iran and lived in England until his death. In 1919, he made another political appearance as an advisor to Lord Curzon in the drafting of the Anglo-Persian Agreement of August 1919. He died in 1927 at the age of 64.

References

External links

19th-century Iranian politicians
20th-century Iranian politicians
1856 births
1927 deaths
Finance ministers of Iran
Prime Ministers of Iran
People from Hamadan
Moderate Socialists Party politicians
People of the Persian Constitutional Revolution
Alumni of Balliol College, Oxford
Sciences Po alumni
Iranian governors
Iranian expatriates in France
Iranian expatriates in the United Kingdom
Regents of Iran
Honorary Knights Grand Cross of the Order of St Michael and St George